Les Routiers is a company that provides travel guide books for eating out and hotels.

History
It began in France in 1935.

In 1970 it opened a UK-based company.

In 2002 an article in The Daily Telegraph claimed that the company charged up to £900 for an entry in their guide book, with the reviews written by sales managers.

The British franchise is headquartered near Claygate railway station.

The company presents annual 'Les Routiers in Britain Awards'.

References

External links
Les Routiers UK No longer active
Slava Bazarski

French companies established in 1934
1970 establishments in the United Kingdom
Book publishing companies of the United Kingdom
Companies based in Surrey
Borough of Elmbridge
Food and drink awards
Gastronomical societies
Hotel guide books
Organizations established in 1934
Publishing companies of France
Restaurant guides
Tourism organisations in the United Kingdom
British companies established in 1970